It Gets Better is an Internet-based 501(c)3 nonprofit with a mission to uplift, empower, and connect lesbian, gay, bisexual, transgender, and queer (LGBTQ+) youth around the globe. It was founded in the United States by gay activist, author, media pundit, and journalist Dan Savage and his husband Terry Miller on September 21, 2010,  in response to the suicides of teenagers who were bullied because they were gay or because their peers suspected that they were gay. Its goal is to prevent suicide by having gay adults convey the message that these teens' lives will improve. The project includes more than 50,000 entries from people of all sexual orientations, including many celebrities; the videos have received over 50 million views.

A book of essays from the project was released in March 2011. The project was given the Academy of Television Arts & Sciences Governor's Award at the 64th Primetime Creative Arts Emmy Awards for "strategically, creatively and powerfully utilizing the media to educate and inspire," according to the academy's chairman and CEO Bruce Rosenblum.

Project history

The It Gets Better Project was founded by Savage in response to the suicide of Billy Lucas and other teenagers who were bullied because they were gay or perceived to be, such as with Raymond Chase, Tyler Clementi, Ryan Halligan, Asher Brown, and Seth Walsh. Reflecting on Lucas' suicide in his Savage Love column, Savage wrote, "I wish I could have talked to this kid for five minutes. I wish I could have told Billy that it gets better. I wish I could have told him that, however bad things were, however isolated and alone he was, it gets better."

Former U.S. President Barack Obama lent his voice to the project and its anti-bullying message during its infancy. On October 21, 2010, Obama contributed his own video saying in part, "We've got to dispel this myth that bullying is just a normal rite of passage; that it's just some inevitable part of growing up. It's not. We have an obligation to ensure that our schools are safe for all of our kids. And for every young person out there you need to know that if you're in trouble, there are caring adults who can help." President Obama and First Lady Michelle Obama would later host an anti-bullying conference in March 2011.  Google Chrome backed the project as well, promoting its YouTube channel and airing a video ad for the project on television; that ad's first appearance came during a May 3, 2011 episode of Glee.

YouTube channel issue
In their YouTube Channel in about, it shows that channel was created 16 or 17 September (depend on timezone) 2004 even though YouTube was launched on February 14, 2005. and It Gets Better Project was founded on September 2010.

Book and television

In March 2011, E. P. Dutton would publish and release It Gets Better: Coming Out, Overcoming Bullying, and Creating a Life Worth Living, a book of essays edited by Dan Savage and Terry Miller that reflect the same theme as the web video project. The book contains more than 100 essays, either transcribed or expanded from the videos or original writings. Contributors include Jennifer Finney Boylan, Gregory Maguire, Meshell Ndegeocello, Michael Cunningham, Suze Orman, and David Sedaris. The book would make the New York Times bestseller list.

Two 1-hour It Gets Better TV specials, which focused on the project's mission and conveyed messages of support, aired in 2012. Broadcast on MTV and simulcast on LGBT-oriented sister network Logo, the specials had premiere airings on February 21 and October 9, 2012.

See also
It Gets Better Mexico
List of suicides which have been attributed to bullying

References

Further reading

External links

 

Anti-bullying campaigns
Anti-bullying organizations in the United States
LGBT and education
American LGBT-related web series
YouTube channels launched in 2010
Positive psychology
Suicide prevention
Dan Savage
Articles containing video clips
2010 establishments in the United States
LGBT organizations in the United States
LGBT and suicide